KWCN (89.9 FM) is a radio station broadcasting a variety format. Licensed to Pinedale, Wyoming, United States, the station is currently owned by WCN, Inc.

Translators
In addition to the main station, KWCN is relayed by two additional translators to widen its broadcast area.

References

External links

WCN
Radio stations established in 2012